Childhood's End is a 1996 American romantic comedy-drama film written and directed by Jeff Lipsky and featuring Sam Trammell and Reiko Aylesworth.  It is Lipsky's feature directorial debut.

Plot
Denise is displeased with Greg and has a relationship with another girl. Greg has his first sexual  relationship with his friend's mother.

Cast
Cameron Foord as Evelyn Edwards
Heather Gottlieb as Rebecca Meyer
Colleen Werthmann as Denise Edwards
Sam Trammell as Greg Chute
Bridget White as Chloe Chute
Reiko Aylesworth as Laurie Cannon
Philip Coccioletti as Harvey Branch
Ellen Tobie as Miranda Chute
Maureen Silliman as Mrs. Meyer

Release
The film was released at the Montreal World Film Festival on August 25, 1996.

Reception
Emanuel Levy of Variety gave the film a mixed review, calling it "mildly engaging but ultimately frustrating."

Stephen Holden of The New York Times gave the film a negative review and wrote that it "has the atmosphere of a tasteful upper-middle-class talk show, crammed with dialogue that is as dispassionate as it is savvy."

References

External links
 
 

1990s English-language films